Kendricks is a surname of British origin, being a variant of the surname Kendrick. Notable people with the surname include:

Eddie Kendricks (1939-1992), American singer and songwriter
Eric Kendricks (born 1992), American football middle linebacker
Lance Kendricks (born 1988), American football tight end
Mychal Kendricks (born 1990), American football linebacker
Sam Kendricks (born 1992), American pole vaulter

See also
Eddie Kendricks (album), an album by Eddie Kendricks
Kendrick (name)